The collection of hymns called Sohila is repeated at bedtime by Sikhs. It consists of three hymns of Guru Nanak, one of Guru Ram Das, and one of Guru Arjan. The word Sohila is derived from sowam wela or saana-na-wela meaning in the Punjabi and pothwari language: the time for sleep.

See also 

Sikh terminology
 Sohila Vichar Part1 - Bhupinder Singh
 Sohila Vichar Part2 - Bhupinder Singh
 Sohila Vichar Part3 - Bhupinder Singh
 Sohila Vichar Part4 - Bhupinder Singh
 Sohila Vichar Part5 - Bhupinder Singh
 Sohila Vichar Part6 - Bhupinder Singh